Bryn Offa (Welsh; meaning Offa's Hill) is a local-authority housing estate in the south-western suburbs of the city of Wrexham, in Wrexham County Borough, north-east Wales in the community of Offa, and is close to the Wrexham Maelor Hospital. The main route through Bryn Offa is the A525 road to Ruthin Road. The estate is situated next to Ysgol Clywedog (formerly known as Ysgol Bryn Offa, or Bryn Offa High School), and the Shrewsbury-Chester railway line.

References

Areas of Wrexham
Housing estates in Wales